The sunburned rat (Rattus adustus) is a species of rat from Enggano Island in Indonesia.  It is only known from the holotype and has not been recorded since its description in 1940.

References 

Rattus
Rats of Asia
Endemic fauna of Indonesia
Rodents of Indonesia
Mammals described in 1940
Taxobox binomials not recognized by IUCN